The 2015 Eurocup Finals were the concluding two games of the 2014–15 Eurocup Basketball season. BC Khimki and Herbalife Gran Canaria faced of in a two-legged series.

It was the third time that Khimki played in a Eurocup Finals, after their league title in 2011 and being runners-up in 2009. For Gran Canaria it was the first ever Finals appearance ever, after they never reached a stage further than the quarterfinals in history. The winner of the Finals would play in the 2015–16 Euroleague regular season.

Road to the Finals

First leg

Second leg

See also
2015 Euroleague Final Four
2015 EuroChallenge Final Four

References

2014-15
2014–15 Eurocup Basketball
2014–15 in Spanish basketball
2014–15 in Russian basketball
Sport in Las Palmas
International basketball competitions hosted by Spain
International basketball competitions hosted by Russia